Kuwait–Cartucho.es was a Kuwaiti UCI Continental cycling team that existed only for the 2017 road cycling season.

In November 2016, the team announced the signing of Davide Rebellin and Stefan Schumacher - both of which have served bans for doping positives.

Team roster

Major wins
2017
Stage 1 Le Tour de Filipinas, Fernando Grijalba
 Stages 4 & 8 Tour du Cameroun, Salah Eddine Mraouni
 Stage 6 Tour du Maroc, Salah Eddine Mraouni
 Overall International Tour de Banyuwangi Ijen, Davide Rebellin
Stage 1, Davide Rebellin
 Stage 5 Tour of Iran (Azerbaijan), Davide Rebellin

References

UCI Continental Teams (Asia)
Cycling teams established in 2017
Cycling teams based in Kuwait